Ratcatcher (Otis Flannegan) is a character appearing in American comic books and other media published by DC Comics, primarily as an enemy of Batman. He belongs to the collective of adversaries that make up the Dark Knight's rogues gallery. Once an actual rat-catcher in Gotham City, Flannegan sank into a life of crime. Calling himself the Ratcatcher because of his special ability to communicate with and train rats, Flannegan has used his minions to plague Gotham on more than one occasion by unleashing hordes of the vermin.

A female version of the character named Cleo Cazo / Ratcatcher 2 appears in the DC Extended Universe film The Suicide Squad (2021), portrayed by Daniela Melchior. Taika Waititi portrays the first Ratcatcher, Cleo's father.

Publication history
Ratcatcher first appeared in Detective Comics #585 (April 1988) and was created by writers Alan Grant and John Wagner, and artist Norm Breyfogle.

Fictional character biography
Otis Flannegan used to work as a rat-catcher in the Gotham City Sanitation Department and always claimed he could train rats to attack. Flannegan was eventually arrested and spent ten years in prison after stabbing a man to death in a street fight. After his release from the Gotham State Penitentiary, Flannegan kidnapped the four officials responsible for his arrest and subsequent sentence. He took his prisoners to a hideout located in the city's sewers, where he kept them for five years. During this period, Flannegan developed his current criminal alter-ego as Ratcatcher. Wearing protective equipment and using his animal training skills, Ratcatcher gathered a large mischief of rats which he used to torture and restrain his prisoners.

After five years of captivity, one of Ratcatcher's prisoners managed to escape, although the Ratcatcher sent his army of rats to kill him. The man was killed upon reaching the surface and his body was found by Batman, who followed the rats back to the Ratcatcher's hideout. Forced to face the Dark Knight, Flannegan was outmatched once Batman got rid of all the rats and Ratcatcher was subsequently delivered to the authorities once again. After spending time in prison, Flannegan escaped his parole hearing by using a flute that he carved to control rats at high pitched frequency. His plans for Gotham were ruined by Batman (actually Dick Grayson replacing Bruce Wayne at the time) in the end and he was captured again.

When Infinite Crisis began, the Ratcatcher was being protected by, in addition to his rat friends, the homeless community. When he was discovered and being taken away, one of the homeless attempted to aid Flannegan, but was easily knocked aside by the arresting officers. The man turned out to be an OMAC in hiding, and the injury apparently initiated its release. The OMAC identified the Ratcatcher as a gamma level threat and vaporized him.

In September 2011, The New 52 rebooted DC's continuity. In this new timeline, Ratcatcher first appears in the series Batman Eternal as part of a plan to subtly destabilize Gotham via public services catastrophes.

Powers and abilities
The Ratcatcher has the ability to communicate and control an army of rats. He has an in-depth knowledge of Gotham's sewer system and the layout of the Blackgate Penitentiary, which comes in handy as Flannegan is able to smuggle items in and out of prison with the help of his little servants. The Ratcatcher also wields a gas gun and can manipulate various things with cyanide gas.

Other versions

Master Comics
In Master Comics, the version of Ratcatcher presented is a man named Ransom Trappe, who is an enemy of Bulletman and Bulletgirl.

Batman: Arkham Unhinged
The Ratcatcher appears in Batman: Arkham Unhinged, in which he is seen participating in Two-Face's trial against Joker as a juror, where Ratcatcher voted guilty due to Joker having poisoned his rats.

 In Batman: Arkham Knight – Genesis, a prequel to the 2015 video game Batman: Arkham Knight, it is revealed that Ratcatcher did survive his encounter with the Penguin in Batman: Arkham City, albeit losing his left eye and arm in the process. After Hush, disguised as Bruce Wayne, enters his domain with two police officers, Ratcatcher sends his rats to attack them, managing to kill the officers and incapacitate Hush. Before the rats could kill Hush, Arkham Knight comes down with a knee to Otis' face, putting him to the ground. Arkham Knight then uses an intense taser to fry Ratcatcher and his rat minions alive. Batman later arrives at the scene of the crime and discovers Otis' charred corpse.

Mother Panic
In the Mother Panic ongoing series, Otis Flannegan, now reformed and homeless, moves into the basement of the hotel the vigilante Violet Page uses as her headquarters. He ultimately orders his rats to dismember the supervillain Pretty's face.

Batman: The Adventures Continue
The Ratcatcher makes a cameo appearance in the comic series, Batman: The Adventures Continue, set in the world of the DC Animated Universe. Ratcatcher appears as an attendee of a party hosted by Harley Quinn and Poison Ivy. This marks the character's first appearance in the DCAU.

In other media

Television
 A character inspired by the Ratcatcher named Patrick Fitz / Ratboy appears in the Batman Beyond episode "Rats", voiced by Taran Noah Smith. He is a teenage runaway with rat-like features and the ability to telepathically control rats, which led to others calling him "Ratboy". He develops an obsession with Dana Tan, frequently sending her love letters and gifts before kidnapping her and taking her to the sewers to confess his love for her. After she rebuffs him, he commands an army of rats to kill her, but Batman saves her. Fitz is later caught in an explosion and presumed dead.
 The Ratcatcher appears in the Harley Quinn episode "There's Nowhere to Go But Down", voiced by James Adomian. This version is an underling of Two-Face.

Film
A female variation of the Ratcatcher named Cleo Cazo / Ratcatcher 2 appears in The Suicide Squad, portrayed by Daniela Melchior. This version is one of the eponymous team's newest members, and the daughter of an unnamed previous Ratcatcher (portrayed by Taika Waititi). She and her father were homeless in Portugal until he invented technology to get the city's rat population to help them. Following his death from a heroin overdose, Cazo came to America and began a criminal career, only to be arrested for armed robbery due to her rats being considered weapons and recruited into the Suicide Squad. Joined by her pet rat "Sebastian" (vocal effects provided by Dee Bradley Baker) and wielding her father's equipment, she assists the squad in infiltrating and destroying a Corto Maltese prison containing Starro, forming bonds with her teammates Bloodsport and King Shark along the way. During the squad's final battle against Starro, Cazo summons an army of Corto Maltese rats to overwhelm and kill the alien by consuming it from within after her teammate Harley Quinn wounds its eye.

Video games
The Ratcatcher appears as a boss in Batman: Dark Tomorrow, voiced by Jonathan Roumie.

See also
 List of Batman family enemies
 Pied Piper, a similarly themed Flash villain
 Pied Piper of Hamelin

References

External links
 Ratcatcher at DC Comics Wiki
 

Characters created by John Wagner
Characters created by Norm Breyfogle
Comics characters introduced in 1988
Fictional gangsters
Fictional torturers 
DC Comics metahumans
DC Comics male supervillains
DC Comics supervillains
Fictional Portuguese people
Suicide Squad members